Minkowski norm may refer to:
 The proper length in Minkowski space
 The norm defined in the tangent bundle of a Finsler manifold
 The vector p-norm
 The norm defined by a Minkowski functional